Shrikrishna Narayan Ratanjankar born 31 December 1899 and died 14 February 1974. He was a distinguished scholar and teacher of Hindustani classical music, from the Agra gharana. Foremost disciple of Vishnu Narayan Bhatkhande and Faiyaz Khan of Baroda State, he also remained principal of Bhatkhande Music Institute (Bhatkande Sangeet Sansthan), Lucknow, for many years, where he trained many noted names in the field of music.

Early life
His father Narayan Govind Ratanjankar was born in Mumbai. Ratanjankar's grand father, Govindrao came to Mumbai in the middle of 19
th century. After graduation Shrikrishna's father, Narayanrao became a police officer in the then British regime. At the age of 7, S.N.Ratanjankar was trained under the guidance of Krishnam Bhatt of Karwar. He also received instruction from Anant Manohar Joshi (Gwalior gharana) and later under Faiyaz Khan of Agra gharana. In 1911, he started training with musicologist Vishnu Narayan Bhatkhande and is today his most well known disciple. He graduated from Bombay University in 1926. It was his  Vishnu Narayan Bhatkhande who sent Ratanjankar to Ustad Faiyaz Khan for a six-year studentship.

Career
In the year 1925, Ratanjankar graduated (BA) from the Wilson College, Mumbai. He was the Principal of Bhatkhande Music University (earlier known as Marris Music College), at Lucknow for several years, and later was appointed Vice-Chancellor at Indira Sangeet Kala Vishva Vidyalaya, Khairagarh, Madhya Pradesh. Later he was once again called to head the Bhatkhande Sangeet Vidyapeeth on a two-year contract. His students include K. G. Ginde, SCR Bhatt, Chidanand Nagarkar, V.G. Jog, Dinkar Kaikini, Shanno Khurana, Sumati Mutatkar, Prabhakar Chinchore, C R Vyas, Chinmoy Lahiri, Yashwant Mahale, S.N.Tripathi, Roshan Lal Nagrath (music director).

As a vocalist he sang Dhrupad and Khayal styles of Agra gharana. A known musicologist like his mentor Bhatkhande, Ratanjankar has more than 800 compositions under his pen name "Sujaan", notated and documented diligently by his disciple K. G. Ginde. He also published books including Geet Manjari, Taan Sangrah, Sangeet Shiksha, and Abhinava Raga Manjari.

He also composed some new ragas such as Marga Bihag, Gopika Basant, Kedar Bahar, Sawani Kedar, Ranjani Kalyan, Hansaranjani, and Salagvarali.

He was appointed Chairman of the Jury of Auditions of AIR (All India Radio) in the mid-1950s.

In 1957 he was awarded the Padma Bhushan by the Government of India, and in 1963 the Sangeet Natak Akademi, India's National Academy for Music, Dance and Drama, awarded him its highest honour for lifetime achievement, the Sangeet Natak Akademi Fellowship.

References

 
  Shrikrishna Narayan Ratanjankar 'Sujan': a many splendoured genius, by Sumati Mutatkar. Lotus Collection, 2001. .
 Pandit Bhatkhande . National Book Trust, 1967.
 S. N. Ratanjankar: List of 78 rpm recordings, nsu.edu

Indian musicologists
1899 births
1974 deaths
Indian male composers
Indian music educators
Hindustani singers
Recipients of the Padma Bhushan in arts
Recipients of the Sangeet Natak Akademi Fellowship
University of Mumbai alumni
Musicians from Mumbai
Hindustani composers
Bandish composers
20th-century Indian singers
20th-century Indian composers
20th-century musicologists
20th-century Indian male singers